Turkey competed at the 2013 World Games held in Cali, Colombia.

Medalists

Ju-jitsu 

Kiraz Sahin competed in the women's fighting 62 kg event.

Karate 

Serap Özçelik won the gold medal in the women's kumite 50 kg event.

References 

Nations at the 2013 World Games
2013 in Turkish sport
2013